Giovanni Leone Reggio (12 December 1888 – 22 December 1972) was an Italian sailor who competed in the 1928 Summer Olympics, in the 1936 Summer Olympics, and in the 1948 Summer Olympics.

In 1928 he finished seventh as a crew member of the Italian boat Twins II in the 6 metre class event.

Eight years later he was a crew member of the Italian boat Italia which won the gold medal in the 8 metre class competition.

In 1948  he finished eighth as a crew member of the Italian boat Ciocca II in the 6 metre class event.

References

External links
 
 
 

1888 births
1972 deaths
Italian male sailors (sport)
Olympic sailors of Italy
Olympic gold medalists for Italy
Olympic medalists in sailing
Sailors at the 1928 Summer Olympics – 6 Metre
Sailors at the 1936 Summer Olympics – 8 Metre
Sailors at the 1948 Summer Olympics – 6 Metre
Medalists at the 1936 Summer Olympics